The 38th Street station was a station on the demolished IRT Sixth Avenue Line in Manhattan, New York City. It had two tracks and two side platforms. It opened in late 1913, as an infill station and closed on December 4, 1938. The next southbound stop was 33rd Street. The next northbound stop was 42nd Street (the Sixth Avenue line was the only one of the elevated lines which had a station between 33rd/34th Street and 42nd Street — and none of the subway lines that replaced the els have such a station), although a now-closed passage under Sixth Avenue running between the 42nd Street–Bryant Park and 34th Street–Herald Square stations had exits to 38th Street.  High crime along the passage's five-block stretch was widely cited as the reason for its closure in 1991.

References

IRT Sixth Avenue Line stations
Railway stations in the United States opened in 1914
Railway stations closed in 1938
Former elevated and subway stations in Manhattan
1914 establishments in New York City
1938 disestablishments in New York (state)

Sixth Avenue